Augochlorini is a tribe of sweat bees in the subfamily Halictinae. They are found in the Nearctic and Neotropic realms. They typically display metallic coloration, with many species that are red, gold, green, blue, or purple.

Genera 

 Andinaugochlora Eickwort, 1969
 Ariphanarthra Moure, 1951
 Augochlora Smith, 1853
 Augochlorella Sandhouse, 1937
 Augochlorodes Moure, 1958
 Augochloropsis Cockerell, 1897
 Caenaugochlora Michener, 1954
 Ceratalictus Moure, 1943
 Chlerogas Vachal, 1904
 Chlerogella Michener, 1954
 Chlerogelloides Engel, Brooks & Yanega, 1997
 Corynura Spinola, 1851
 Corynurella Eickwort, 1969
 Halictillus Moure, 1947
 Ischnomelissa Engel, 1997
 Megalopta Smith, 1853
 Megaloptidia Cockerell, 1900
 Megaloptilla Moure & Hurd, 1987
 Megommation Moure, 1943
 Micrommation Moure, 1969
 Neocorynura Schrottky, 1910
 Paracorynurella Gonçalves, 2010
 Paroxystoglossa Moure, 1941
 Pereirapis Moure, 1943
 Pseudaugochlora Michener, 1954
 Rhectomia Moure, 1947
 Rhinocorynura Schrottky, 1909
 Rhynchochlora Engel, 2007
 Temnosoma Smith, 1853
 Thectochlora Moure, 1940
 Xenochlora Engel, Brooks & Yanega, 1997
 †Oligochlora Engel, 1996

References

External links
 
 

Halictidae